Neil Primrose may refer to:
Neil Primrose (politician) (1882–1917), British Liberal politician and soldier
Neil Primrose, 7th Earl of Rosebery (born 1929), Scottish nobleman
Neil Primrose (musician) (born 1972), drummer of the Scottish band Travis